A special adviser (SpAd) is a temporary civil servant who advises and assists UK government ministers or ministers in the Scottish and Welsh devolved governments. They differ from impartial civil servants in that they are political appointees.

Special advisers are paid by the government and appointed under Section 15 of the Constitutional Reform and Governance Act 2010. There are four pay bands for special advisers.

Background

Special advisers were first appointed from 1964 under the Harold Wilson's first Labour government to provide political advice to Ministers and have been subsequently utilised by all following governments.

Code of conduct
Advisers are governed by a code of conduct which goes some way to defining their role and delineates relations with the permanent civil service, contact with the media and relationship with the governing party, inter alia:the employment of special advisers adds a political dimension to the advice and assistance available to Ministers while reinforcing the political impartiality of the permanent Civil Service by distinguishing the source of political advice and support [...] Special advisers are employed to help Ministers on matters where the work of Government and the work of the Government Party overlap and where it would be inappropriate for permanent civil servants to become involved. They are an additional resource for the Minister providing assistance from a standpoint that is more politically committed and politically aware than would be available to a Minister from the permanent Civil Service.The rules for their appointment, and status in relation to ministers, are set out in the Ministerial Code.

Number and cost of special advisers

Number 
There is no legal limit on the number of special advisers, although the current total is less than it was under Tony Blair. The government had previously accepted calls, made in 2000 by the Neill Committee on Standards in Public Life, for such a legal cap. By 2002, however, the government had altered its position, saying in response to the Wicks Committee report on standards in public life that "the Government does not believe that the issue of special advisers can be considered as a numerical issue. The issue is about being transparent about accountability, roles and responsibilities and numbers".

Cost 
The total cost of special advisers in 2006–07 was £5.9 million, which has since increased to £9.6 million for 2018–19.

There are four pay bands for special advisers.

Current Pay Band 4 special advisers

As of 31 March 2020, there were 101.7 full-time equivalent special advisers working for the government.

As of July 2021, the following advisers were included in a government list of special advisers in Pay Band 4:

Criticisms 
Special advisers have sometimes been criticised for engaging in advocacy while still on the government payroll or switching directly between lobbying roles and the special adviser role.

Being a special adviser has become a frequent career stage for young politicians, before being elected Members of Parliament, which has attracted criticism.

In fiction
Fiction set within the Westminster village frequently includes characters that are special advisers, such as Frank Weisel in Yes Minister and Glen Cullen in The Thick of It at the ministerial level, and figures like Malcolm Tucker (also of The Thick of It) seen operating at the apex of power, often overriding or manipulating Prime Ministers and other world leaders.

Shortly after Boris Johnson became Prime Minister in 2019, British Comedian Josh Berry gained online media attention for his character Rafe Hubris, an arrogant, Eton-educated SpAd at 10 Downing Street, who calls Johnson 'BloJo', his chief of staff Dominic Cummings 'Big Daddy Cum-Cum' and health secretary Matt Hancock 'Matt Cock-in-his-Hands'. In 2021, Berry published a spoof diary Staggering Hubris, written in Hubris' voice, purporting to tell the "real story" of the chaos behind the scenes as the British government attempted to deal with the Coronavirus pandemic.

See also

 Special adviser (Norway)
 UK Government efficiency, transparency and accountability page, which includes regular reports listing special advisers

Footnotes

External links
Guidance - Special Advisers: code of conduct Current version; updated as required

 
British Prime Minister's Office
Politics of the United Kingdom